A Casing-cutter is a device used in petroleum industry to cut a complete section of a casing, a liner or all others tubular components in a well bore.
This cutting tool is composed by several cutting  blades (reinforced with Tungsten carbide) pivotally mounted on support body.
During cutting operations, the cutting blades are gradually deployed outside the support body by hydraulic pressure or mechanical action

See also 
Drilling rig
Driller (oil)
Drag bit
Drill bit
Drilling stabilizer
Hole opener
Roller reamer

External links 
 Hydraulic Casing Cutter sheet from Drillstar Industries 
 Hydraulic Casing Cutter sheet from PionnerOilTools

Drilling technology